In physics, energy density is the amount of energy stored in a given system or region of space per unit volume.

Often only the useful or extractable energy is measured, which is to say that inaccessible energy (such as rest mass energy) is ignored. In cosmological and other general relativistic contexts, however, the energy densities considered are those that correspond to the elements of the stress–energy tensor and therefore do include mass energy as well as energy densities associated with pressure.

Energy per unit volume has the same physical units as pressure and in many situations is synonymous. For example, the energy density of a magnetic field may be expressed as and behaves like a physical pressure. Likewise, the energy required to compress a gas to a certain volume may be determined by multiplying the difference between the gas pressure and the external pressure by the change in volume. A pressure gradient describes the potential to perform work on the surroundings by converting internal energy to work until equilibrium is reached.

Overview

There are different types of energy stored in materials, and it takes a particular type of reaction to release each type of energy. In order of the typical magnitude of the energy released, these types of reactions are: nuclear, chemical, electrochemical, and electrical.

Nuclear reactions take place in stars and nuclear power plants, both of which derive energy from the binding energy of nuclei. Chemical reactions are used by organisms to derive energy from food and by automobiles to derive energy from gasoline. Liquid hydrocarbons (fuels such as gasoline, diesel and kerosene) are today the densest way known to economically store and transport chemical energy at a large scale (1 kg of diesel fuel burns with the oxygen contained in ≈15 kg of air). Electrochemical reactions are used by most mobile devices such as laptop computers and mobile phones to release energy from batteries.

Types of energy content
There are several different types of energy content. One is the theoretical total amount of thermodynamic work that can be derived from a system, at a given temperature and pressure imposed by the surroundings. This is called exergy. Another is the theoretical amount of electrical energy that can be derived from reactants that are at room temperature and atmospheric pressure. This is given by the change in standard Gibbs free energy. But as a source of heat or for use in a heat engine, the relevant quantity is the change in standard enthalpy or the heat of combustion.

There are two kinds of heat of combustion:
 The higher value (HHV), or gross heat of combustion, includes all the heat released as the products cool to room temperature and whatever water vapor is present condenses.
 The lower value (LHV), or net heat of combustion, does not include the heat which could be released by condensing water vapor, and may not include the heat released on cooling all the way down to room temperature.

A convenient table of HHV and LHV of some fuels can be found in the references.

In energy storage and fuels

In energy storage applications the energy density relates the energy in an energy store to the volume of the storage facility, e.g. the fuel tank. The higher the energy density of the fuel, the more energy may be stored or transported for the same amount of volume. Given the high energy density of gasoline, the exploration of alternative media to store the energy of powering a car, such as hydrogen or battery, is strongly limited by the energy density of the alternative medium.  The same mass of lithium-ion storage, for example, would result in a car with only 2% the range of its gasoline counterpart.  If sacrificing the range is undesirable, it becomes necessary to carry that much more fuel.  

The energy density of a fuel per unit mass is called the specific energy of that fuel. In general an engine using that fuel will generate less kinetic energy due to inefficiencies and thermodynamic considerations—hence the specific fuel consumption of an engine will always be greater than its rate of production of the kinetic energy of motion.

Energy density differs from energy conversion efficiency (net output per input) or embodied energy (the energy output costs to provide, as harvesting, refining, distributing, and dealing with pollution all use energy). Large scale, intensive energy use impacts and is impacted by climate, waste storage, and environmental consequences.

No single energy storage method boasts the best in specific power, specific energy, and energy density. Peukert's law describes how the amount of useful energy that can be obtained (for a lead-acid cell) depends on how quickly it is pulled out.

Alternative options are discussed for energy storage to increase energy density and decrease charging time.

The figure above shows the gravimetric and volumetric energy density of some fuels and storage technologies (modified from the Gasoline article).

Some values may not be precise because of isomers or other irregularities.  See Heating value for a comprehensive table of specific energies of important fuels.

Generally the density values for chemical fuels do not include the weight of the oxygen required for combustion. The atomic weights of carbon and oxygen are similar, while hydrogen is much lighter. Figures are presented in this way for those fuels where in practice air would only be drawn in locally to the burner. This explains the apparently lower energy density of materials that contain their own oxidizer (such as gunpowder and TNT), where the mass of the oxidizer in effect adds weight, and absorbs some of the energy of combustion to dissociate and liberate oxygen to continue the reaction. This also explains some apparent anomalies, such as the energy density of a sandwich appearing to be higher than that of a stick of dynamite.

List of material energy densities

The following unit conversions may be helpful when considering the data in the tables: 3.6 MJ = 1 kW⋅h ≈ 1.34 hp⋅h. Since 1 J = 10−6 MJ and 1 m3 = 103 L, divide joule/m3 by 109 to get MJ/L = GJ/m3. Divide MJ/L by 3.6 to get kW⋅h/L.

In chemical reactions (oxidation) 

Unless otherwise stated, the values in the following table are lower heating values for perfect combustion, not counting oxidizer mass or volume. When used to produce electricity in a fuel cell or to do work, it is the Gibbs free energy of reaction (ΔG) that sets the theoretical upper limit. If the produced  is vapor, this is generally greater than the lower heat of combustion, whereas if the produced  is liquid, it is generally less than the higher heat of combustion. But in the most relevant case of hydrogen, ΔG is 113 MJ/kg if water vapor is produced, and 118 MJ/kg if liquid water is produced, both being less than the lower heat of combustion (120 MJ/kg).

In nuclear reactions

Other release mechanisms

In material deformation 
The mechanical energy storage capacity, or resilience, of a Hookean material when it is deformed to the point of failure can be computed by calculating tensile strength times the maximum elongation dividing by two. The maximum elongation of a Hookean material can be computed by dividing stiffness of that material by its ultimate tensile strength. The following table lists these values computed using the Young's modulus as measure of stiffness:

In batteries

Nuclear energy sources
The greatest energy source by far is matter itself.  This energy, E = mc2, where m = ρV, ρ is the mass per unit volume, V is the volume of the mass itself and c is the speed of light.  This energy, however, can be released only by the processes of nuclear fission (0.1%), nuclear fusion (1%), or the annihilation of some or all of the matter in the volume V by matter-antimatter collisions (100%). Nuclear reactions cannot be realized by chemical reactions such as combustion.  Although greater matter densities can be achieved, the density of a neutron star would approximate the most dense system capable of matter-antimatter annihilation possible.  A black hole, although denser than a neutron star, does not have an equivalent anti-particle form, but would offer the same 100% conversion rate of mass to energy in the form of Hawking radiation. In the case of relatively small black holes (smaller than astronomical objects) the power output would be tremendous.

The highest density sources of energy aside from antimatter are fusion and fission. Fusion includes energy from the sun which will be available for billions of years (in the form of sunlight) but so far (2021), sustained fusion power production continues to be elusive.

Power from fission of uranium and thorium in nuclear power plants will be available for many decades or even centuries because of the plentiful supply of the elements on earth, though the full potential of this source can only be realized through breeder reactors, which are, apart from the BN-600 reactor, not yet used commercially. Coal, gas, and petroleum are the current primary energy sources in the U.S. but have a much lower energy density. Burning local biomass fuels supplies household energy needs (cooking fires, oil lamps, etc.) worldwide.

Thermal power of nuclear fission reactors
The density of thermal energy contained in the core of a light water reactor (PWR or BWR) of typically 1 GWe (1,000 MW electrical corresponding to ≈3,000 MW thermal) is in the range of 10 to 100 MW of thermal energy per cubic meter of cooling water depending on the location considered in the system (the core itself (≈30 m3), the reactor pressure vessel (≈50 m3), or the whole primary circuit (≈300 m3)). This represents a considerable density of energy which requires under all circumstances a continuous water flow at high velocity in order to be able to remove the heat from the core, even after an emergency shutdown of the reactor. The incapacity to cool the cores of three boiling water reactors (BWR) at Fukushima in 2011 after the tsunami and the resulting loss of the external electrical power and of the cold source was the cause of the meltdown of the three cores in only a few hours, even though the three reactors were correctly shut down just after the Tōhoku earthquake. This extremely high power density distinguishes nuclear power plants (NPP's) from any thermal power plants (burning coal, fuel or gas) or any chemical plants and explains the large redundancy required to permanently control the neutron reactivity and to remove the residual heat from the core of NPP's.

Energy density of electric and magnetic fields

Electric and magnetic fields store energy.  The (volumetric) energy density is given by

The solution will be (in SI units) in joules per cubic metre. In the context of magnetohydrodynamics, the physics of conductive fluids, the magnetic energy density behaves like an additional pressure that adds to the gas pressure of a plasma.

In ideal (linear and nondispersive) substances, the energy density (in SI units) is

In the case of absence of magnetic fields, by exploiting Fröhlich's relationships it is also possible to extend these equations to anisotropic and nonlinear dielectrics, as well as to calculate the correlated Helmholtz free energy and entropy densities.

When a pulsed laser impacts a surface, the radiant exposure, i.e. the energy deposited per unit of surface, may be called energy density or fluence.

See also

 Energy content of biofuel
 Energy density Extended Reference Table
 Figure of merit
 Food energy
 Heat of combustion
 High-energy-density matter
 Power density and specifically
 Power-to-weight ratio
 Rechargeable battery
 Solid-state battery
 Specific energy
 Specific impulse

Footnotes

Further reading
 The Inflationary Universe: The Quest for a New Theory of Cosmic Origins by Alan H. Guth (1998) 
 Cosmological Inflation and Large-Scale Structure by Andrew R. Liddle, David H. Lyth (2000) 
 Richard Becker, "Electromagnetic Fields and Interactions", Dover Publications Inc., 1964

External links
   "Aircraft Fuels." Energy, Technology and the Environment Ed. Attilio Bisio. Vol. 1. New York: John Wiley and Sons, Inc., 1995. 257–259
 "Fuels of the Future for Cars and Trucks" – Dr. James J. Eberhardt – Energy Efficiency and Renewable Energy, U.S. Department of Energy – 2002 Diesel Engine Emissions Reduction (DEER) Workshop San Diego, California - August 25–29, 2002
 
 

Energy
Density